Illini may refer to:

 Illini and Saluki, a pair of passenger trains operated by Amtrak between Chicago and Carbondale, Illinois
 Illini State Park, an Illinois state park on 510 acres (206 ha) in LaSalle County, Illinois, United States
 Illinois Confederation (also known as the Illini or Illiniwek), a group of 12–13 Native American tribes in the upper Mississippi River valley of North America
 Features and affiliates of the University of Illinois at Urbana–Champaign:
 The Fighting Illini intercollegiate athletic teams
 The Daily Illini newspaper
 Illini Media, which owns the Daily Illini
 Illini Union, the student activity center